Kiswara (Aymara for Buddleja incana, hispanicized spelling Quisuara) is a mountain in the Andes of Peru, about  high. It is situated in the Ayacucho Region, Cangallo Province, Totos District. Kiswara lies east of Huch'uy Puka Q'asa and Muqu Wasi, and southeast of Chawpi Urqu.

References

Mountains of Peru
Mountains of Ayacucho Region